The 1975–76 Atlanta Flames season was the fourth season for the franchise. This season would mark a turning point for the franchise. After making the playoffs just once in their first three seasons, the Flames would miss the playoffs only once between 1976 and 1996 (that coming in 1991-92).

Regular season

Final standings

Schedule and results

Playoffs
Atlanta qualified for the post-season for the second time in franchise history, and would face the Los Angeles Kings in a best-of-three preliminary round series.  The Kings finished with a 38–33–9 record, earning 85 points and second place in the Norris Division.  They finished the season with three more points than the Flames.

The series opened at The Forum in Inglewood, California, and the Kings scored in the first minute of play, as Tom Williams beat goaltender Dan Bouchard to give Los Angeles a 1–0 lead.  The Kings doubled their lead in the second period when Bob Nevin scored.  In the third period, the Flames cut the Kings lead to 2–1 after a goal by Barry Gibbs, however, that's as close as Atlanta would get, as Los Angeles held on for the 2–1 victory.

The second game was played at the Omni Coliseum, as the Flames needed a win to force a third and deciding game.  Both goaltenders played great games, however, the Kings Bob Berry scored with 1:44 remaining in the third period, as Los Angeles held on to beat the Flames 1–0.  Kings goaltender Rogie Vachon  made 27 saves for the shutout.

Los Angeles Kings 2, Atlanta Flames 0

Player statistics

Skaters
Note: GP = Games played; G = Goals; A = Assists; Pts = Points; PIM = Penalty minutes

†Denotes player spent time with another team before joining Atlanta.  Stats reflect time with the Flames only.
‡Traded mid-season

Goaltending
Note: GP = Games played; TOI = Time on ice (minutes); W = Wins; L = Losses; OT = Overtime/shootout losses; GA = Goals against; SO = Shutouts; GAA = Goals against average

Transactions
The Flames were involved in the following transactions during the 1975–76 season.

Trades

Free agents

Waivers

Draft picks

References
 Flames on Hockey Database

Atlanta
Atlanta
Atlanta Flames seasons